Streshnevo is a station on the Moscow Central Circle of the Moscow Metro that opened in September 2016. The station is in the border of the Sokol and Shchukino districts of Moscow; however the station's name comes from the adjacent Pokrovskoye-Streshnevo District. The original name was slated to be Volokolamskaya; but the city government agreed to change the name prior to the start of service.

There is a large gap between the platform and the cars at this station. In 2016, during a test run, one of the trains was scratched by the platform as it passed. Although the ED4 trains will not run on this line, the problem was corrected so that this does not become a problem with future trainsets.

Transfers
There are transfer between Streshnevo MCC station and Streshnevo station of MCD-2 urban rail line. It was opened in 2019, few months before MCD opening.

References

External links 
 mkzd.ru

Moscow Metro stations
Railway stations in Russia opened in 2016
Moscow Central Circle stations